Onthophagus taurus, the taurus scarab, is a species of dung beetle in the genus Onthophagus and the family Scarabaeidae.

Description
These small beetles are oval shaped, the color is usually black or reddish brown. Sometimes the pronotum has a weak metallic sheen. Males have on the heads a pair of long protrusions or horns (hence the species name) that they use to fight with each other to gain mating rights with females.

Some males do not have horns, and therefore do not come into the fight, but have larger gonads. A similar dimorphism in males have been found in some other species (Ageopsis nigicollis, Podischnus agenor). This adaption reduces direct competition with horned males.

Horns of Onthophagus taurus lack obvious homology to other insect traits. Hence, they are known as an evolutionary novelty, even by the term strictest definition. The evolution and diversification of horns of this species are rooted in an intricate patchwork of extrinsic and intrinsic mechanisms that involves parental effects, developmental plasticity, multiple internal pathways monitored by the doublesex (dsx) gene expression, the hedgehog gene expression as well as the insulin/insulin-growth factor (IGF) pathway, among numerous other elements.

Onthophagus taurus can pull a weight of 1141 times its  and is considered the strongest animal on earth on a body weight to lift ratio.

Distribution
This species is present in Australia, Europe, Morocco, Algeria, Tunisia, Syria, Iraq, Transcaucasia, Asia Minor, Iran, Afghanistan, Central Asia and USA (Texas).

Sexual selection

A prominent feature of the mating system of O taurus is the competition for fertilisation of females by males engaging in trials of strength over the possession of breeding tunnels. Ionizing radiation applied to O. taurus males induced mutations that reduced the expression of such strength-related precopulatory sexual traits.  However, sexual selection by females for two generations was sufficient to remove such mutations from progeny.

Economic value
Dung beetles have been utilized in the breakdown of manure on sheep and dairy farms worldwide.

In September 2013 O. taurus was released for the first time in New Zealand, in the Gore District of Southland. These beetles pull the manure into the ground to create their brood balls, which they use as egg chambers.

This increases grazing space for cattle, reduces habitats for flies and bacteria, and reduces the need for chemical fertilizers.

References

Scarabaeinae
Beetles described in 1759
Beetles of New Zealand
Taxa named by Johann Christian Daniel von Schreber